For information on all Indiana State University sports, see Indiana State Sycamores

The Indiana State Sycamores football team is the NCAA Division I football program of Indiana State University in Terre Haute, Indiana. They compete in the Missouri Valley Football Conference. The team last played in the NCAA Playoffs in the 2014 NCAA Division I Football Championship. Their first season was 1896. The Sycamore's greatest season was 1983, when coach Dennis Raetz led them to the 2nd round of the 1983 NCAA Division I Football Championship versus the Southern Illinois Salukis and ended the season with a record of 9–4. The Sycamores also appeared in 1984 NCAA Division I Football Championship playoffs. The Indiana State Sycamores play their home games at Memorial Stadium, which seats 12,764.

History

Classifications
1952–1964: NCAA / NAIA (dual membership)
1965–1972: NCAA College Division
1970–1973: NAIA Division I
1973–1975: NCAA Division II
1976–1977: NCAA Division I
1978–1981: NCAA Division I–A
1982–present: NCAA Division I–AA/FCS

Conference memberships
1896–1933: Independent
1934–1947: Indiana Intercollegiate Conference
1948–1950: Independent
1951–1967: Indiana Collegiate Conference
1968–1972: Independent
1973–1975: Division II Independent
1976–1977: Missouri Valley Conference (Division I)
1978–1981: Missouri Valley Conference (Division I-A)
1982–1985: Missouri Valley Conference (Division I-AA)
1986–present: Gateway Football Conference / Missouri Valley Football Conference

Conference championships
The 1964 Indiana State Sycamores football team shared the Indiana Collegiate Conference (ICC) title in 1964 with four other teams (Ball State, with the Sycamores finishing with a 4–2 conference record and a 6–2 overall mark.

Bowls and playoffs

Bowl games
The Sycamores have participated in one bowl game, garnering a record of 0–1.

Division I NCAA Playoffs
The Sycamores have appeared in 3 NCAA Division I Football Championships. Their combined record is 2–3.

Rankings
The Sycamores reached the AP and United Press International Top Ten mid-way through the 1974 season; they would not return to the Top Ten until the 1983 season.  The 2018 Sycamores finished # 22 in the final Coaches poll & # 25 in the final STATS poll.

Head coaches

All Indiana State Coaching Records are available at:

Rivalries

Ball State

From 1924 to 2014, the Sycamores played Ball State (Ind.) University 65 times; the series stands at 38–24–1 in favor of Ball State.

In 1940, the respective Blue Key chapters sponsored a trophy presentation, the 'Victory Bell' to reward the winner of the annual game between Indiana State and Ball State. The Sycamores hold the Victory Bell, having won the last match 27–20 on the road in 2014.

Traditions

Homecoming
The term Homecoming was first used in print announcements for the Alumni-Varsity Basketball Game on Dec. 9, 1916. By the year 1919, this event became known as Blue and White Day and featured dances and entertainment for alumni of the Normal School.
In 1921 the events were organized around a football game scheduled earlier in the autumn. A bonfire and pep rally were added to the festivities in 1922; the Blue-and-White Parade in 1923; and in 1937, Bette Whitmore (Kappa Kappa) was elected ISUs first Homecoming Queen.
The 2010 season will mark the 106th season of Sycamore football and the 91st Homecoming; the Sycamores will face conference foe, Illinois State, on October 9. This will mark the 7th time that Illinois State has been the Homecoming opponent; following a tremoundous victory (59–24) the Sycamores now own a 5–2 mark vs. Illinois State in Homecoming games.

As of 2012; Indiana State owns a 50–36–2 record in Homecoming games; the outcomes of the remaining 5 games are unknown.

Victory Bell
A symbol of the traditional rivalry in football between Indiana State and Ball State, the Victory Bell tradition was inaugurated in 1940 when the Blue Key chapters at both schools arranged to donate a bell to be presented to the victor of the football game. The idea was to start a traditional exchange of the bell as a means of improving relationships between the two student bodies. The Victory Bell series is 34–19–1 in favor of Ball State, though the Sycamores won their last meeting in 2014.

Stadiums

The Sycamores have played football at venerable Memorial Stadium since the 1949 campaign. Originally constructed in 1922–24, at a cost of $450,000; the 12,764-seat stadium remains a fixture at the intersection of Wabash and Brown Avenues in Terre Haute, IN.

Memorial Stadium's inauguration was on May 5, 1925, as the local minor league baseball team, the Terre Haute Tots, hosted their Three-I League rivals, the Peoria Tractors, before an estimated crowd of 9,000. Among the esteemed visitors were Major League Baseball Commissioner Judge Kenesaw Mountain Landis and Charles Barnard of the Cleveland Indians.

The facility was acquired (via a 99-year lease) by Indiana State University in 1967. The installation of Astroturf made Indiana State the first university to own a football stadium with artificial turf.

Player of the year

National
Shakir Bell – 2011 Walter Payton Award Finalist (Top 2 vote receiver)
Johnny Towalid – 2012 Co-National FCS Defensive Back of the Year (by College Football Performance)

Conference
Edgar Freese – 1965 Indiana Collegiate Conference DT (Lineman)
Reggie Allen – 1979 Missouri Valley Conference QB (Offense)
Gerry Gluscic – 1979 Missouri Valley Conference DE (Defense)
Craig Shaffer – 1981 Missouri Valley Conference LB (Defense)
Jeff Miller – 1984 Missouri Valley Conference QB (Offense)
Wayne Davis – 1984 Missouri Valley Conference DB (Defense)
Jeff Miller – 1985 Missouri Valley Conference QB (Offense)
Vencie Glenn – 1985 Missouri Valley Conference DB (Defense)
Derrick Franklin – 1991 Missouri Valley Football Conference RB (Offense)
Julian Reese - 2001 Missouri Valley Football Conference QB (Newcomer of the Year)
Shakir Bell – 2011 Missouri Valley Football Conference RB (Offense)
Ryan Boyle - 2018 Missouri Valley Football Conference QB (Newcomer of the Year)
Cade Chambers - 2022 Missouri Valley Football Conference QB (Freshman of the Year)

All-Americans 1st Team

Jeff Keller, DE – 1967 American Football Coaches Association
Chris Hicks, OT – 1975 American Football Coaches Association
Vincent Allen, RB – 1976 American Football Coaches Association
Ed Martin, DE – 1983 American Football Coaches Association
Wayne Davis, DB – 1984 American Football Coaches Association
Vencie Glenn, DB – 1985 American Football Coaches Association
Steve Mckeel DB – 1986 Associated Press
Mike Simmonds, OT – 1986 American Football Coaches Association
Steve McKeel DB – 1987 Associated Press
Derrick Franklin, RB – 1991 Walter Camp, The Sports Network
Shawn Moore, OG – 1993 American Football Coaches Association
Dan Brandenburg, DT – 1994 American Football Coaches Association
Dan Brandenburg, DT – 1995 The Sports Network, American Football Quarterly
Tom Allison, PK – 1995 Don Hansen's Football Gazette
Troy Lefevra, DE – 1998 Don Hansen's Football Gazette
DeJuan Alfonzo, DB/RS – 1999 American Football Coaches Association
Shakir Bell, RB – 2011 Associated Press, American Football Coaches Association, The Sports Network
Ben Obaseki, DL – 2011 Associated Press
Joshua Appel, LS – 2015 STATS All-American

Academic All-American
 Gary Brown, E – 1971
 Michael Eads, E – 1972
 Mark Maley E −1973
 Daniel Millington, DE – 2009
 Alex Sewall, DB – 2011

NCAA Post-Graduate Scholarship
 Jeffrey Miller, QB – 1986

All-Conference

All-Indiana Collegiate Conference

All-Missouri Valley Conference

All-Missouri Valley Football Conference

Career leaders

Passing

Rushing

Receiving

Scoring

Career leaders in bold

Coach of the Year

National (1)
Curt Mallory – 2019 Phil Steele FCS Coach of the Year

District / Region (5)
Jerry Huntsman – 1966 NCAA District #1
Jerry Huntsman – 1968 NCAA District #2
Trent Miles – 2010 AFCA Region #4
Trent Miles – 2012 AFCA Region #4
Mike Sanford – 2014 AFCA Region #4

Conference (8)
 Mark Dean – 1952 Indiana Collegiate Conference
 Bill Jones – 1959 Indiana Collegiate Conference
 Bill Jones – 1960 Indiana Collegiate Conference
 Bill Jones – 1963 Indiana Collegiate Conference
 Jerry Huntsman – 1966 Indiana Collegiate Conference
 Dennis Raetz – 1984 Missouri Valley Conference
 Trent Miles – 2010 Missouri Valley Football Conference
 Curt Mallory – 2018 Missouri Valley Football Conference

Notable alumni

Sycamores in Professional Leagues
Fifty former Sycamores have played in professional football leagues. The leagues include the NFL, CFL, AFL, the UFL and the USFL.  The most notable players are:

All-Star Game participants
 2013 – FN Lutz, OG (FCS Senior Scout Bowl)
 2010 – Pat Burke, OG (FCS Senior Scout Bowl)
 2010 – Darrius Gates, RB (FCS Senior Scout Bowl)
 2006 – Carl Berman, (Magnolia Gridiron Classic)
 2006 – Kyle Hooper, PK (East Coast Bowl)
 2006 – Madison Miller, DE (East Coast Bowl)
 2005 – Blayne Baggett, QB (Magnolia Gridiron Classic)
 2005 – LaDrelle Bryant, LB (Magnolia Gridiron Classic)
 1999 – DeJuan Alfonzo, DB (All-Star Gridiron Classic)
 1995 – Dan Brandenburg, DT (Blue-Gray)
 1992 – Charles Swann, WR (Senior Bowl)
 1992 – Charles Swann, WR (Japan Bowl)
 1990 – Steve Elmlinger, WR (Senior Bowl)
 1985 – Vencie Glenn, DB (Blue-Gray)
 1986 – Vencie Glenn, DB (Senior Bowl)
 1982 – Kirk Wilson, WR (Senior Bowl)
 1981 – Craig Shaffer, LB (Blue-Gray)

Indiana Football Hall of Fame

Future non-conference opponents 
Announced schedules as of July 20, 2019.

References

External links

 
American football teams established in 1896
1896 establishments in Indiana